The Roncador River is a river of the state of Mato Grosso, Brazil. It is a tributary of the Manso River.

Course

The Casca River joins the Roncador River in an arm of the Manso Dam.

See also
List of rivers of Mato Grosso

References

Sources

Rivers of Mato Grosso